Howz-e Shah-e Pa'in persian حوض شاه پایین is a village in Khwahan Badakhshan Province, north-eastern Afghanistan.

References 

Populated places in Khwahan District